A women's Olympic Football Tournament was held for the second time as part of the 2000 Summer Olympics. The tournament features 8 women's national teams from six continental confederations. The 8 teams are drawn into two groups of four and each group plays a round-robin tournament. At the end of the group stage, the top two teams advanced to the knockout stage, beginning with the semi-finals and culminating with the gold medal match at Sydney Football Stadium on 28 September 2000.

Medal winners

Venues

The tournament was held in three venues across three cities:
Bruce Stadium, Canberra
Melbourne Cricket Ground, Melbourne
Sydney Football Stadium, Sydney

Qualification

The seven best quarter-finalists at the 1999 FIFA Women's World Cup and the host nation Australia qualified for the 2000 Olympic women's football tournament.

Africa (CAF)

Asia (AFC)

North and Central America (CONCACAF)

South America (CONMEBOL)

Europe (UEFA)

Oceania (OFC)
 Hosting nation

Seeding

Squads

Match officials

Group stage

Group E

Group F

Knockout stage

Semi-finals

Bronze medal match

Gold medal match

Statistics

Goalscorers

Assists

FIFA Fair Play Award
 Winner: 

Germany won the FIFA Fair Play Award, given to the team with the best record of fair play during the tournament.

Tournament ranking

References

External links
Olympic Football Tournaments Sydney 2000 - Women, FIFA.com
RSSSF Summary
FIFA Technical Report (Part 1), (Part 2), (Part 3) and (Part 4)

Women's football at the 2000 Summer Olympics
2000
Oly
2000